Fernand Picard may refer to:
 Fernand Picard (politician)
 Fernand Picard (engineer)